Janusz Mirowski (born in 1944) is a former Polish footballer who played as a forward. Little is known about Mirowski's career as a footballer, but it is known that he played for Lechia Gdańsk in the II liga during the 1966–67 season, making a total of 9 league appearances. Mirowski's only goal for Lechia came in his final appearance with the club, scoring in the Polish Cup in Lechia's defeat to Warmia Olsztyn II.

References

1944 births
Living people
Lechia Gdańsk players
Polish footballers
Association football forwards